In 1918 Florida joined the list of states and territories providing license plates to vehicle owners, and no new states entered the prestate era. There were now 48 states and 5 territories that were issuing license plates. The prestate era ended when Florida began to issue license plates.

Passenger baseplates

See also

Antique vehicle registration
Electronic license plate
Motor vehicle registration
Vehicle license

References

External links

1918 in the United States
1918